Kurteh Kavil (also Romanized as Kūrteh Kavīl; also known as Kūr Takvīl) is a village in Targavar Rural District, Silvaneh District, Urmia County, West Azerbaijan Province, Iran. At the 2006 census, its population was 57, in 12 families.

References 

Populated places in Urmia County